Nudaurelia xanthomma is a moth of the  family Saturniidae. It is known from Cameroon, Ghana and Sierra Leone.

The ground colour of the forewings is brownish red-yellow, the underside is yellow-brown.

Subspecies
Nudaurelia xanthomma xanthomma  (Rothschild, 1907) (Sierra Leone/Ghana)
Nudaurelia xanthomma amathusia  Weymer, 1909  (from Cameroon)

References
Rothschild 1907c. New African Saturniidae. - Annals and Magazine of Natural History (7)20:1–10.

Saturniinae
Moths described in 1907
Insects of Cameroon
Moths of Africa
Insects of West Africa